Modesto Varischetti (24 October 1874 – 3 September 1920) was an Italian miner who was trapped in a gold mine for nine days after a thunderstorm flooded it in March 1907. The 12-level mine was located at Bonnievale, near Coolgardie, Western Australia.

Biography 
Varischetti was born in Gorno, in northern Italy, near Milan. The region was a well known mining area and he became a miner at age 13. He married his wife Maria and had five children, but like others in the poor region, he (along with two of his brothers) left Italy to earn better money in Australia.

Arriving in February 1900, he first worked in Clunes, Victoria. He traveled to Italy again, before returning in 1903 and being attracted to the Westralia & Eastern Extension Mine in Bonnievale. While there, his wife died in 1905, compelling him to make a return trip to Italy a third time. By October 1906, he was back in Bonnievale.

The mine was located between two valleys, but there was little concern for flooding due to the extremely dry local conditions. However, an unusual thunderstorm on the afternoon of 19 March dumped a year's worth of rainfall in just a few hours. Water soon funneled into the mine and most escaped.

Varischetti was trapped deep in the mine and survived by retreating into an air pocket until he was rescued. Pumping and mine equipment were then able to slowly lower the water level. A diver, Frank Hughes, using a long air hose and deep-sea diving equipment, first reached Varischetti five days after the flooding and provided him with food, clothes, candles, messages, and letters of encouragement. After nine days, the water level was finally low enough for Varischetti to walk to safety.

Herbert Hoover, who would later become President of the United States of America, was a mining engineer at nearby Kanowna and was involved in the mine rescue.

After his rescue, Varischetti was briefly feted, recovered, and returned to mining. He died 13 years later, at the age of 46, from fibrosis. He is buried in the Kalgoorlie Cemetery.

Legacy 
Varischetti's grave is marked by a headstone erected in 1987 and is part of a heritage walk trail devised by the Kalgoorlie-Boulder Cemetery Board.

Australian folk group Cloudstreet tells Modesto Varischetti's story in a song. The song's writer is unknown, and it was found in a booklet of songs entitled Moondyne Joe and other Sandgroper Ballads. It is based on an English folk song, "Down in the Coalmine".

Notes

References
Austen, Tom (1986), The ENTOMBED MINER An account of the rescue of Modesto Varischetti in Bonnie Vale in 1907, St. George Books.

External links

https://web.archive.org/web/20080721015738/http://www.transwa.wa.gov.au/Default.aspx?tabid=149
http://www.abc.net.au/local/stories/2007/02/09/1843472.htm
http://www.wa.alp.org.au/news/0307/23-01.php
https://web.archive.org/web/20080908022817/http://www.lambretta.it/ing/imprese/aus2005c.html
https://web.archive.org/web/20111005122227/http://www.comitesperth.org/Appuntamenti/kalgoorlie2007.htm
https://web.archive.org/web/20090417230111/http://www.comune.gorno.bg.it/Editorial/newsCategoryViewProcess.jsp?editorialID=4806
http://ozfolksongaday.blogspot.it/2011/06/down-in-goldmine.html
http://www.valdelriso.it/giornalino/ilsecoloxx/mobile/index.html

1873 births
1930 deaths
Australian miners
Coolgardie, Western Australia
Italian miners
Mining disasters in Australia
People from Goldfields-Esperance